Aralık is a town and district of the Iğdır Province in the Eastern Anatolia region of Turkey. It is the location of the Aras corridor, which connects Turkey with Azerbaijan. Part of the district forms the international border between Turkey and Armenia, which has been closed since 1993, and the border between Turkey and Iran. The town of Aralık is mainly inhabited by Azerbaijanis.

Government
Mustafa Güzelkaya was elected mayor of Aralık in the local elections of March 2019. Mustafa Görmüş is Kaymakam.

Aras corridor
The district of Aralık includes the Aras corridor, which connects Turkey with Azerbaijan through the Nakhchivan exclave. The corridor is formed by the confluence of the Aras and Lower Karasu rivers and was ceded to Turkey by the Soviet Union in the Treaty of Kars. It is predominantly inhabited by Kurds and is the location of the Dilucu Border Gate, the only border crossing between Turkey and Azerbaijan, opened in May 1992.

Demographics

References

Populated places in Iğdır Province
Districts of Iğdır Province
Erivan Governorate
Kurdish settlements in Turkey